is a railway station on the Nemuro Main Line of JR Hokkaido located in Nemuro, Hokkaidō, Japan.

References 

Railway stations in Hokkaido Prefecture
Stations of Hokkaido Railway Company
Railway stations in Japan opened in 1920
Nemuro, Hokkaido